Willie J. McCarter (born 26 July 1946) is an American retired basketball player. He was a 6'3" (1.90 m) 175 lb (79 kg) guard. He played at Drake University, averaging 19.9 ppg in three  seasons. He was drafted by the Los Angeles Lakers with the 12th pick in the 1969 NBA draft, and played three seasons with the Lakers and Portland Trail Blazers. 

After his NBA career ended in 1972, he became the coach at Harper Creek High School in Battle Creek, Michigan. In January 1973, he signed to play with the Grand Rapids Tackers of the Continental Basketball Association, playing only when it did not conflict with his coaching. McCarter later served as head coach at the University of Detroit Mercy for three seasons from 1979 to 1982, replacing Smokey Gaines after Gaines was hired as the head basketball coach at San Diego State University.

On September 23, 2005, McCarter suffered the first of three strokes within nine months. With the help of his doctors, he recovered.

In February 2009, Drake University retired his No. 15 Bulldogs jersey.

McCarter's younger brother Andre also played in the NBA.

Head coaching record

References

External links
http://www.thedraftreview.com/index.php?option=com_content&view=article&id=141

http://www.whotv.com/Global/story.asp?S=4548958

1946 births
Living people
American men's basketball players
Basketball coaches from Indiana
Basketball players from Gary, Indiana
Detroit Mercy Titans men's basketball coaches
Drake Bulldogs men's basketball players
Los Angeles Lakers draft picks
Los Angeles Lakers players
Point guards
Portland Trail Blazers players
Shooting guards
Sportspeople from Gary, Indiana